Heavy Duty may refer to:

Characters 
 Heavy Duty (G.I. Joe), a fictional character in the G.I. Joe universe
 Heavy Duty or Heavy Load (Transformers), a character in the fictional Transformers universe

Other uses 
 Heavy duty truck, a vehicle type
 Heavy duty battery, a version of zinc–carbon battery
 Heavy Duty (album), a 1997 album by Xtatik
 "Heavy Duty", a song from the soundtrack album This Is Spinal Tap

See also 
 HD (disambiguation)
 Heavy (disambiguation)
 Duty (disambiguation)
 Heavy Load (disambiguation)